Henry Flanagan, O.P. (1918–1992) was an Irish Dominican priest, teacher, musician, artist and sculptor.

Flanagan was born in Dublin in 1918, the son of a carpenter.  He attended the O'Connell School before joining the Dominican Order in 1936. Flanagan was ordained in 1943 and in 1945 joined Newbridge College, where he taught English history, art and music.

For his sculpture he was known as the Preacher in Stone, one newer art format he was interested in was plastic sculpture.
Flanagan created some 400 works (both religious and secular) in wood, stone, concrete, plaster, plastic, copper, bronze, and enamels.

To honor Fr. Flanagans contribution to music, and Annual Henry Flanagan Memorial Concert is held in Newbridge, which a various musicians and choirs participate.

The Centenary of his birth was celebrated in the Dominicans, The Priory Institute in Dublin, with the display of a number of his sculptures, in march 2019.

Works
 Statue of St. Colman, Newry Cathedral 1991.
 War Widows, Polished Limestone 1991. https://www.whytes.ie/art/war-widows-1991/149724/?SearchString=&LotNumSearch=&GuidePrice=&OrderBy=&ArtistID=&ArrangeBy=list&NumPerPage=15&offset=90
 The Girl with the Flaxen Hair, Sculpture in Sycamore, 1979. https://www.whytes.ie/art/the-girl-with-the-flaxen-hair-1979/144347/?SearchString=&LotNumSearch=&GuidePrice=&OrderBy=&ArtistID=15323&ArrangeBy=list&NumPerPage=15&offset=0
 Fr. Peter O’Higgins Dominican Martyr , stone sculpture, Church of St Eustace, Dominican Priory / Newbridge College.

References

1918 births
1992 deaths
Irish sculptors
20th-century Irish Roman Catholic priests
Irish Dominicans
Christian clergy from Dublin (city)
20th-century sculptors
People educated at O'Connell School